Diapheromera is a genus of stick insects in the family Diapheromeridae. There are about 14 described species in Diapheromera.

Species
These 14 species belong to the genus Diapheromera.

References

Further reading

External links

 

Phasmatodea